James Abbott Mackintosh Bell (23 September 1877 – 31 March 1934) was a New Zealand geologist, writer and company director. He was born in St Andrews, Quebec on 23 September 1877 and graduated from Harvard University in 1904. In 1909, he married Vera Margaret Beauchamp, the older sister of the writer Katherine Mansfield.

References

1877 births
1934 deaths
20th-century New Zealand geologists
20th-century New Zealand writers
20th-century New Zealand male writers
Harvard University alumni
Canadian emigrants to New Zealand